Temenggong or Tumenggung (Jawi: تمڠݢوڠ; Temenggung, Hanacaraka: ꦠꦸꦩꦼꦁ​ꦒꦸꦁ​; Tumenggung) is an old Malay and Javanese title of nobility, usually given to the chief of public security.

Responsibilities
The Temenggong is usually responsible for the safety of the monarch (raja or sultan), as well as overseeing the state police and army. A temenggong may also be assigned by its sovereign as a ruler in frontier regions, acting as either a regent or a viceroy with additional development & military responsibility (comparable to European Marquess).

Johor
In the Sultanate of Johor, the Temenggong of Muar held a fief centered in Segamat for approximately two centuries and the Temenggong of Johor was the head of the fief (Johor mainland) between 1760 and 1868. The full rendition of the Johor Temenggong was Temenggung Seri Maharaja. Although the Temenggong was the head of the fief's administration, the Temenggong held the Johor Sultanate by virtue of his being a vassal of the Sultan. In 1868, Temenggong Abu Bakar declared himself as a maharaja, assumed control over Muar and declared himself an independent ruler. In 1885, he assumed the title of Sultan with the blessing of Britain.

Majapahit 
Negarakretagama  cantos 10  describe  that  the  mayor  visited  the  Kepatihan  Amangkubhumi  (Prime Minister  building)  led  by  Gajah  Mada  in  order  to  report  the  administrative  activities  in  the  area.  Majapahit government   administration   had   five   authoritative   leaders   called Sang   Panca   Ri   is   capability   they were 
 Patih  Amangkubhumi  (Prime  Minister)  /  the  Prime  Minister  who  supervised  Rakryan  Tumenggung (commander),  Rakryan  Rangga  (commander  assistant),  Rakryan  Kanuruhan  (communicator)  and Rakryan Demung (regulator the royal household). He ruled as the regulator of the government implementation in all regions of Majapahit, and therefore Sang Panca Ri Wilwatikta was visited by the State authorities and local subordinates for government affairs. 
 From the Prime Minister, commands down to wedana (the district officer), the district head.
 From wedana down to akuwu, the head of a group of village. 
 From akuwu down to buyut, village elders. 
 From buyut down to the villagers

Mataram Sultanate
During the era of Mataram Sultanate, temenggongs were directly appointed by sultan and act as a regional leader in regions not directly administrated by the court (mostly in coastal regions). They were responsible for raising and commanding their own regional army, which could be assigned in a military expedition supervised by the sultan himself. One of the most renowned temenggong in Mataram was Bahureksa, the regent of Kendal. He was executed by Sultan Agung due to his failure while leading the Mataram army during the unsuccessful Siege of Batavia in 1628.

See also 
 Laksamana
 Marquess
 Penghulu Bendahari
 Syahbandar
 Defence minister

References

Malay culture